Gregor Traber (born 2 December 1992, in Tettnang) is a German athlete specialising in the sprint hurdles events. He finished fifth in the 60 metres hurdles at the 2014 World Indoor Championships.

His personal bests are 13.47 seconds in the 110 metres hurdles (Geneva 2012) and 7.56 in the 60 metres hurdles (Sopot 2014).

Competition record

References

External links 
 
 
 

German male hurdlers
1992 births
Living people
People from Bodenseekreis
Sportspeople from Tübingen (region)
World Athletics Championships athletes for Germany
Athletes (track and field) at the 2016 Summer Olympics
Olympic athletes of Germany
Athletes (track and field) at the 2020 Summer Olympics